Ramsen may refer to:
 Ramsen, Rhineland-Palatinate, a village in Donnersbergkreis, Rhineland-Palatinate, Germany
 Ramsen, Schaffhausen, village in Schaffhausen, Switzerland
 Ramsen (card game), a traditional Bavarian card game

See also 
 Remsen (disambiguation)
 Rumsen (disambiguation)